Brisbane Roar FC is an association football club based in Brisbane, Australia. This page consists of information and statistics about all previous and current Managers of the Roar.

Managerial history

Bleiberg
Miron Bleiberg was appointed as the then Queensland Roar's inaugural manager on 2 March 2005. Under pressure from the fans to deliver on his promises of attractive, attacking and successful football he resigned on 12 November 2006 following a poor start to the 2006–07 season. After much speculation, Bleiberg was replaced by former Australian national team coach, Frank Farina just three days after Bleiberg's resignation.

Farina
Frank Farina's arrival led to a mini-revival which saw the club narrowly miss out on what would have been the Roar's first finals appearance, on goal difference. The 2007–08 season, however, saw Farina make up for the shortfall of the previous season, qualifying for the finals for the first time in the club's history. A memorable performance in the second leg of the semi-final saw the Roar defeat arch rivals 2–0 (2–0 agg.) Sydney FC in front of a (then) club record 36,221 fans to qualify for the preliminary final against the Newcastle Jets. The Roar would controversially lose 3–2 to the Newcastle side, who would ultimately go on to win the Grand Final. Farina again qualified for the finals in 2008–09, where the Roar dispatched of Central Coast Mariners 4–2 on aggregate, however they ultimately lost, again in the preliminary final, to Adelaide United after failing to capitalise on their dominance. On 10 October 2009, Farina was arrested by Queensland Police for Driving under the influence. He was initially suspended by the Roar and asked to show cause as to why he should not be sacked for tarnishing the name of the club. It was announced that assistant manager, Rado Vidošić fwould step into a caretakers role until a decision had been made which would include the M1 Derby, which the Roar lost 1–0 at home. Farina was ultimately sacked on 14 October 2009 and was replaced by former Australian Under-20 national team coach, Ange Postecoglou.

Postecoglou
Ange Postecoglou arrived mid-season armed with the task of picking up the pieces of a season in tatters. The 2009–10 season ended as the worst in the club's short history, finishing second from the bottom. Postecoglou completed a turn-around in the 2010–11 season. He made wholesale changes to the squad, commencing with the replacement of the "old-guard" of Charlie Miller, Craig Moore and Danny Tiatto and brought in his own squad which was a mixture of youth and talented experience. Under his brand of possession/attacking football, he would lead the team to win the club's inaugural Championship and go on to complete the club's first Double by also wrapping up the Premiership in a memorable 2011 A-League Grand Final in front of a then club record 50,168 supporters. The club went on an Australian sporting record 36-match unbeaten run which commenced in the 2010–11 season and ran through to the 2011–12 season. After much speculation on his future at the club, it was reported that Postecoglou had signed a three-year contract extension.

With such a successful season behind him, there was much talk as to whether the Roar could equal or better that in the 2011–12 season. Their title credentials were in doubt when the club went on a club-record worst losing streak of five matches immediately following the ending of their record 36-match unbeaten streak. Postecoglou remained steadfast in the club's footballing philosophy and the club went on to record just one loss in the last 14 games of the regular season to finish league runners-up. Unable to retain the Premiers Plate, Postecoglou led the club to back-to-back Premierships in a 2012 A-League Grand Final in front of a club-record 50,344 supporters. Postecoglou also led the Roar's initial foray into the 2012 Asian Champions League as reward for their success in the previous season. Success was mixed, picking up two draws from four matches.

On 24 April 2012, Postecoglou left the club by way of mutual consent, citing a desire to seek "a new challenge". Ange leaves the club as the most successful manager in the club's history.

On 26 April 2012, it was reported that Postecoglou did not, in fact, sign a new contract at the conclusion of the 2010–11 season due to the uncertainty around the club's ownership at the time. That allowed his original two-year contract with the club to expire at the conclusion of the 2011–12 season and leave to join Melbourne Victory without the Victory needing to pay out his "contract" with the Roar.

Vidošić
On 25 April 2012, Rado Vidošić was promoted to the Managers' position after serving seven years as Assistant Manager under the three previous managers before him.
On December 18, 2012, Vidošić was removed as coach, taking up the role of technical director for the club. Vidošić was only manager for thirteen (13) matches before transferring to the new role, similar to the one offered to Postecoglou before his exit earlier in 2012.

Mulvey
On 18 December 2012, Mike Mulvey was appointed manager after Rado Vidošić was "removed" from his position.

Aloisi
On 26 May 2015, John Aloisi was named manager of Brisbane Roar. In both of his first two seasons at the club, the Roar achieved a top 3 finish in the league, and made it to the semi-finals.

In May 2017, Aloisi signed a new three-year contract to stay on as manager of Brisbane.

Managers
 Manager dates and statistics are sourced from WorldFootball.net
 Only first-team competitive matches are counted. Wins, losses and draws are results at the final whistle; the results of penalty shoot-outs are not counted.
 Statistics are complete up to and including the match played on 14 September 2021.

Key 
M = matches played; W = matches won; D = matches drawn; L = matches lost; GF = Goals for; GA = Goals against; Win % = percentage of total matches won.

References

External links
 Official website

Managers
Brisbane Roar
Roar